The list below includes lists of ambassadors and high commissioners of the United Kingdom (who fulfil the function of ambassadors in fellow countries of the Commonwealth of Nations).

This article includes, in separate sections, ambassadors of the former Kingdom of Great Britain (1707–1801) and Kingdom of England (10th century–1707).

Ambassadors and High Commissioners of the United Kingdom
Afghanistan
Albania
Algeria
Angola
Argentina
Armenia
Australia
Austria
Azerbaijan
Bahamas
Bahrain
Bangladesh
Barbados
Belarus
Belgium
Belize
Bolivia
Bosnia-Herzegovina
Botswana
Brazil
Brunei
Bulgaria
Burma
Cambodia
Cameroon
Canada
Chile
China
Colombia
DR Congo
Costa Rica
Côte d'Ivoire
Croatia
Cuba
Cyprus
Czech Republic
Denmark
Dominican Republic
East Timor
Ecuador
Egypt
El Salvador
Eritrea
Estonia
Ethiopia
Fiji
Finland
France
The Gambia
Georgia
Germany
Ghana
Greece
Guatemala
Guinea
Guyana
Haiti
Holy See
Honduras
Hungary
Iceland
India
Indonesia
Iran
Iraq
Ireland
Israel
Italy
Jamaica
Japan
Jordan
Kazakhstan
Kenya
Korea, DPR (North Korea)
Korea, RO (South Korea)
Kosovo
Kuwait
Kyrgyzstan
Laos
Latvia
Lebanon
Liberia
Libya
Lithuania
Luxembourg
Macedonia
Madagascar
Malawi
Malaysia
Mali
Malta
Mauritius
Mexico
Moldova
Mongolia
Montenegro
Morocco
Mozambique
Namibia
Nepal
Netherlands
New Zealand
Nicaragua
Nigeria
Norway
Oman
Pakistan
Panama
Papua New Guinea
Paraguay
Peru
Philippines
Poland
Portugal
Qatar
Romania
Russia
Rwanda
Saudi Arabia
Senegal
Serbia
Seychelles
Sierra Leone
Singapore
Slovakia
Slovenia
Solomon Islands
Somalia
South Africa
South Sudan
Spain
Sri Lanka
Sudan
Sweden
Switzerland
Syria
Tajikistan
Tanzania
Thailand
Tonga
Trinidad and Tobago
Tunisia
Turkey
Turkmenistan
Uganda
Ukraine
United Arab Emirates
United States
Uruguay
Uzbekistan
Venezuela
Vietnam
Yemen
Zambia
Zimbabwe

Ambassadors of Great Britain
List of ambassadors of Great Britain to Denmark
List of ambassadors of Great Britain to France
List of ambassadors of Great Britain to the Holy Roman Emperor
List of ambassadors of Great Britain to Portugal
List of ambassadors of Great Britain to Russia
List of ambassadors of Great Britain to Sweden

Ambassadors of the Kingdom of England
List of ambassadors of the Kingdom of England to Denmark
List of ambassadors of the Kingdom of England to France
List of ambassadors of the Kingdom of England to Portugal
List of ambassadors of the Kingdom of England to Russia
List of ambassadors of the Kingdom of England to Sweden

See also
List of heads of missions of the United Kingdom

 
Lists of ambassadors by country of origin